Cheese Shop can refer to:

 a shop that sells cheese
 The Cheese Shop, Louth, in Lincolnshire, England
 The Cheese Store of Beverly Hills, in California, U.S.
 Cheese Shop sketch, from Monty Python's Flying Circus, 1972
 The Cheese Shop, a former British comedy writing and performing team
 Python Package Index, known as the Cheese Shop, a software repository

See also